Events in the year 1685 in Norway.

Incumbents
Monarch: Christian V

Events
The construction of Kristiansten Fortress was finished.
The construction of the Old Town Bridge in Trondheim was finished.

Births

25 November – Eiler Hagerup d.e., bishop (died 1743).

Deaths
23 August – Ludvig Rosenkrantz, nobleman and civil servant, the first baron in Norway (born 1628).

See also

References